Joseph Louis-Rosario Fontaine (26 August 1900 – 16 October 1986) was a Liberal party member of the House of Commons of Canada. He was born at Saint-Damase, Quebec. He was a master butcher, meat cutter, farmer and merchant by career.

Fontaine was mayor of Notre-Dame-de-Saint-Hyacinthe parish between 1938 and 1952. He was first elected to Parliament at the St. Hyacinthe—Bagot riding in the 1945 general election. With a minor spelling change to the riding in 1947, he was re-elected at Saint-Hyacinthe—Bagot in 1949 and 1953. He was defeated by Théogène Ricard of the Progressive Conservative party in the 1957 election.

References

External links
 

1900 births
1986 deaths
Members of the House of Commons of Canada from Quebec
Liberal Party of Canada MPs
Canadian farmers
Canadian merchants
Mayors of places in Quebec